Elections to Rochford District Council, in Essex, England, were held on 4 May 1995.  One third of the council was up for election.

Results summary

Ward results

Ashingdon

Barling & Sutton

Canewdon

Foulness & Great Wakering East

Grange & Rawreth

Great Wakering Central

Great Wakering West

Hawkwell East

Hawkwell West

Lodge

Trinity

Wheatley

Whitehouse

References

1995
1995 English local elections
1990s in Essex